The Salt River Range is a mountain range in western Wyoming. The 56 mile long range forms the eastern boundary of Star Valley as well as the western boundary of the Greys River valley.

See also 
 List of mountain ranges in Wyoming

Notes 

Mountain ranges of Wyoming
Landforms of Lincoln County, Wyoming